Louis-Alfred-Adhémar Rivet (September 15, 1873 – January 14, 1951) was a Canadian lawyer and politician.

Born in Joliette, Quebec, he was educated at Laval University where he received a B.A and LL.B. He was a practicing lawyer in the law firm of Rivet, Robillard & Tetrault. He was elected to the House of Commons of Canada for Hochelaga in a 1904 by-election, after the sitting MP, Joseph Alexandre Camille Madore, appointed Puisne Judge of  the Supreme Court of Quebec. A Liberal, he was re-elected in 1904 and 1908. He was defeated in 1911.

Electoral record

References
 
 

1873 births
1951 deaths
Liberal Party of Canada MPs
Members of the House of Commons of Canada from Quebec
Université Laval alumni